Nintendo Magazine System was the official Nintendo magazine of Australia. In publication for seven years until 2000, the magazine was a branch of Official Nintendo Magazine, the UK's official Nintendo magazine, which was also called Nintendo Magazine System at the time. On 12 November 2008 a new official Australian Nintendo magazine was announced.

The Australian version of NMS was originally published by Trielle Corporation as a 68-page magazine. The first issue appeared in April 1993, and featured Super Mario Land 2 on the cover. It was Australia's official Nintendo magazine, and was very critical to poorly made video game software, with scores for such games often in the low thirties. The magazine often included news and articles not relating to Nintendo products, from information on the idea of virtual reality, to the highest selling coin-operated arcade games at the time.

Starting with Issue 34 in January 1996, Catalyst Publishing took control of the magazine, but retained the issue numbering. The last issue of Nintendo Magazine System was Issue 89, the August 2000 issue.

See also
 Nintendo Power
 Nintendo Official Magazine

References

External links
 Nintendo Magazine System - Retro Gaming Australia
Archived Nintendo Magazine System on the Internet Archive

1993 establishments in Australia
2000 disestablishments in Australia
Computer magazines published in Australia
Defunct computer magazines
Defunct magazines published in Australia
Magazines about Nintendo
Magazines established in 1993
Magazines disestablished in 2000
Monthly magazines published in Australia
Video game magazines published in Australia